Zophodia subcanella is a species of snout moth in the genus Zophodia. It was described by Zeller in 1848. It is found in Brazil.

References

Moths described in 1848
Phycitini